Stanley Francis "Stan" Cwiklinski (pronounced "quick-LIN-skee", born July 25, 1943) is an American former rower. Competing in the eights he won an Olympic gold medal in 1964 and a bronze at the 1965 European Champsionship.

Cwiklinski took up rowing at La Salle University, where he was teammates with Hugh Foley, and studied zoology. In 1963, he joined the Vesper Boat Club. He was a career naval officer specializing in marine salvage.

References

Cited sources

Rowers at the 1964 Summer Olympics
Living people
Sportspeople from New Orleans
American male rowers
United States Navy officers
Olympic gold medalists for the United States in rowing
1943 births
Medalists at the 1964 Summer Olympics
European Rowing Championships medalists